Kenneth William Penner (April 24, 1896 – May 28, 1959) was a Major League Baseball pitcher who played for two seasons. He pitched for the Cleveland Indians in 1916 and the NL-Pennant winning Chicago Cubs in 1929; he did not appear in the World Series.

In between his two major league seasons, he played in the minor leagues for 28 seasons (1913 - 1943); he recorded a career record of 330-284 (.537 win pct) and a 3.67 ERA over 5,571 innings. He won league ERA titles for the 1916 Marshalltown Ansons in the Central Association with a 1.41 ERA and the 1927 Houston Buffaloes of the Texas League with a 2.52 ERA.

He managed several minor league teams between 1934 and 1944, compiling a record of 437-636 (.407) and one pennant; he notably the Louisville Colonels of the American Association and the Bellingham Chinooks where he led them to the 1938 Western International League Pennant.  He was a player/coach for the Sacramento Solons in 1941–1942. He was a scout for the St. Louis Cardinals from 1945 through 1957.

References

External links

1896 births
1959 deaths
Baseball players from Indiana
Bellingham Chinooks players
Cadillac Chiefs players
Chicago Cubs players
Cleveland Indians players
Columbus Joy Riders players
Grand Rapids Black Sox players
Houston Buffaloes players
Indianapolis Indians players
Keokuk Indians players
Louisville Colonels (minor league) managers
Louisville Colonels (minor league) players
Major League Baseball pitchers
Marshalltown Ansons players
Minor league baseball managers
Montgomery Bombers players
People from Boonville, Indiana
Portland Beavers players
Rochester Red Wings managers
Sacramento Senators players
Sacramento Solons managers
Sacramento Solons players
St. Louis Cardinals scouts
Salt Lake City Bees players
Vernon Tigers players
Wichita Izzies players